Gary Williams is a Democratic politician and former member of the Pennsylvania House of Representatives. He briefly served the 197th district, running in a special election to fill the last eight months of Jewell Williams' term. Williams has served as an aide to a variety of politicians, including Philadelphia City Councilors John F. Street and Darrell Clarke and state representatives Frank L. Oliver and Michelle Brownlee. He now works as a clerk in the Philadelphia Marriage Records Office.

References

Democratic Party members of the Pennsylvania House of Representatives
Living people
African-American state legislators in Pennsylvania
21st-century American politicians
Politicians from Philadelphia
Year of birth missing (living people)
21st-century African-American politicians